Ruth Ward (born November 19, 1936) is an American politician who has served in the New Hampshire Senate from the 8th district since 2016.

References

1936 births
Living people
Republican Party New Hampshire state senators
21st-century American women politicians
Women state legislators in New Hampshire